Gonzalo Andrés Jara González (born December 1, 1998) is a Chilean footballer who currently plays as midfielder for Unión San Felipe in the Primera B de Chile.

Career
After playing loaned to several clubs and having no chances to play for his native club, Universidad Católica, on second half 2019 Jara joined LigaPro club Oliveirense as a free agent, taking up his first international experience.

On 2020 season, he joined Uruguayan club Progreso. In 2021, he moved to Ecuador and joined Mushuc Runa.

In 2023, he returned to Chile and joined Unión San Felipe.

International career
Jara represented Chile U17 at the 2015 FIFA U17 World Cup, making appearances in all four matches played by Chile and scoring a goal.

Career statistics

Club
 

Notes

International

References

External links
 
 Gonzalo Jara at playmakerstats.com (English version of ceroacero.es)

Living people
1998 births
Footballers from Santiago
Chilean footballers
Chilean expatriate footballers
Chile youth international footballers
Club Deportivo Universidad Católica footballers
A.C. Barnechea footballers
Unión La Calera footballers
Deportes Magallanes footballers
Magallanes footballers
AD Oliveirense players
C.A. Progreso players
Mushuc Runa S.C. footballers
Unión San Felipe footballers
Primera B de Chile players
Chilean Primera División players
Liga Portugal 2 players
Uruguayan Primera División players
Uruguayan Segunda División players
Association football midfielders
Chilean expatriate sportspeople in Portugal
Chilean expatriate sportspeople in Uruguay
Chilean expatriate sportspeople in Ecuador
Expatriate footballers in Portugal
Expatriate footballers in Uruguay
Expatriate footballers in Ecuador